Alfredo Bordonali (born December 4, 1919) was an Italian professional football player.

He spent one season in the Serie A with A.S. Roma. He also played for B.P.D. Colleferro in Serie C.

External links
Profile at Enciclopediadelcalcio.it

1919 births
Year of death missing
Italian footballers
Serie A players
A.S. Roma players
Association football midfielders